Enid Strict, better known as The Church Lady, is a recurring character from a series of sketches on the American television show, Saturday Night Live, that appeared from 1986 to 1990, and again in 1996, 2000, 2011, and 2016. She also appeared on The Dana Carvey Show in March 1996, reading a Top Ten List, "New Titles for Princess Diana."

About the character
The Church Lady is a mature woman named Enid Strict who is the uptight, smug, and pious host of her talk show Church Chat. Her show includes guests, usually celebrities whom she interviews, played by other cast members of SNL or by the celebrities themselves. However, the interviews are only a guise for her to call out the guests on their various alleged sins, which are often publicly known news events of the day. They initially receive sarcastic praise from her, until the interview degrades into a tirade against their apparent lack of piety and their secular lifestyles, culminating with her judgmental admonishments and condemnation. She often takes others to task for following the desires of their tingling and/or engorged "naughty parts."

Carvey said that he based the character on women who he knew from his church growing up who would keep track of people's attendance. He developed the character in his stand-up comedy act prior to joining SNL. Writer Rosie Shuster helped him develop the concept of the Church Chat talk show. The Church Lady made numerous appearances on SNL, and Nora Dunn recalled that "everybody loved that character."

Memorable moments

Dana Carvey recalls that he was prompted by executive producer Lorne Michaels to introduce the character (when it was still in SNL rehearsals) at a Neil Young concert at Madison Square Garden, which Church Lady interrupted, fussing and fuming: "What are we doing here? What's all this noise?"

During the first season Dana Carvey appeared as a cast regular on Saturday Night Live, Joe Montana and Walter Payton co-hosted the show and both appeared in a Church Lady skit for a game of football with Church Lady.  Montana throws a touchdown pass to Church Lady after she distracted Payton (who was playing defense against her) and hid in the audience.  At the end of the sketch, all three did the "superior dance."

A classic moment was in March 1987 when she interviewed Jim and Tammy Faye Bakker (played by Phil Hartman and Jan Hooks) at the height of the sex scandal involving Jim Bakker and Jessica Hahn. During the show the televangelists begged for donations, and a mascara-dripping Tammy Faye recounted her experience with "demonic raisins."

Another notable moment in October 1987 featured actor Sean Penn, playing himself as a guest on the show.  During the interview, the Church Lady (who calls him "Sin," and then quickly corrects her "mistake") makes numerous references to his then-wife Madonna, and her overt sexuality, claiming Madonna "doesn't quite live up to her namesake."  The more she goes on about his wife's "bulbous buttocks gyrating" and her displaying of her "chestal area," the more angered Penn becomes, until he eventually throws a punch, hitting her directly in the nose. Carvey recalls that he was genuinely scared because Penn (who was well known for losing his temper) came dangerously close to actually hitting him.

Jan Hooks would appear again on the sketch in December 1987, this time playing Jessica Hahn, of whom the Church Lady said in a sarcastic tone "Oh, sit right down, Jessie. Here we are not like those other talk shows that fawn all over you. No, siree!" Jessica Hahn claims that she is tired of degradation, to which the Church Lady produces the Playboy for which she posed (only the cover is shown). Jessica Hahn says that that type of degradation had her authorization and "I am free to degrade myself only how I see fit! For once Jessica Hahn is in control of her life!" and then goes on to say "Being used and degraded in a hotel room in Florida was not my decision. Being used and degraded in the pages of this magazine, that was my decision. I am in control of being used and degraded!"

Though the sketch routinely mocked popular celebrity scandals, in 1989, guest host Rob Lowe managed to avoid having his various sex scandals of the day (including the leaking of a sex tape involving the actor) mentioned per a special deal he cut with the Church Lady. In return for her silence on his various sex scandals, Rob Lowe submitted to corporal punishment at the end of the interview. However, Rob Lowe began to enjoy being spanked by the Church Lady, who took this as a sign that Satan had possessed Lowe's butt and began screaming for Satan to leave the actor's body.

Another sketch in February 1990 found child actor Fred Savage playing the Church Lady's niece, Enid. Savage was dressed in a miniature version of the Church Lady's outfit and glasses, and co-spoke all of the familiar admonishing catchphrases, as well as performing the "Superior Dance" at the beginning of the sketch. In the same sketch was a visit from Donald Trump (as played by Phil Hartman), right after his legendary divorce. The Church Lady scolded him and his "Jezebel," to which Trump responded by frankly telling her that he "could buy and sell this freak show, or dog and pony act, or whatever." The Church Lady responded that "if you could do that, then Enid is just some little boy in a dress."

In a teaser trailer for the 1990 film Opportunity Knocks (available on that film's DVD), the Church Lady interrupts, warning viewers not to see the film and is punched in the face and knocked to the floor by Dana Carvey who introduces himself. The Church Lady retaliates and the fight continues off-screen as the trailer ends.

Another notable sketch, in October 2000, featured the Church Lady interviewing Anne Heche (played by Chris Kattan), with the Church Lady teasing Anne about her bisexuality by offering her a snack and giving her the choice between a "wiener" and a "taco" (implying a choice between two obvious body parts) and referring to a bisexual as someone who "reaches down the front of somebody's pants and they're satisfied with whatever they find."

Sometimes the Church Lady was accompanied by a character known as "Minister Bob," played by Chevy Chase. He seemed to be the only person the Church Lady admired. During a church picnic an inebriated woman interrupted the gathering, shocking all the old ladies present, and saying how the Church Lady acts so high and mighty but is out of touch with the problems of people in everyday life. Minister Bob then acts more down to Earth than the Church Lady, saying it is the responsibility of a pastor to deal with people with problems. When he seems to be leading the woman into why problem drinking is a bad idea, he ends with saying "...because of SATAN!", and joins the Church Lady in her Superior Dance.

Toward the end of the character's run, a parody sketch of the film Misery aired in which Dana Carvey is doing a stand-up tour in Colorado, and announces to the audience this is a special day as it is the last time he will ever do a Church Lady sketch. He is then driving in a snowstorm with Jon Lovitz, where Carvey says it was about time to put the Church Lady to rest and not make it a running gag. Lovitz (who played Satan in a December 1988 Church Lady sketch) pathetically asks if he can now play her (Lovitz's stalled career was a running joke on SNL the season after his official departure), but is interrupted by heavy snow flurries crushing the car. Carvey is rescued by guest star Roseanne Barr, playing the Church Lady's disturbingly obsessed Number One Fan, who is so gleeful at rescuing Carvey and buys him things such as "orthopedic shoes, just like the Church Lady wears!" However, she becomes furious when she reads a comedy review saying Carvey has stopped doing the Church Lady, and intends to hold him hostage until he promises to resume playing her. Reciting the lines was not good enough either, as Roseanne holds Carvey at gunpoint forcing him to wear the Church Lady wig and get her facial expressions and voice just right. Lorne Michaels tries to find the missing Carvey, but becomes increasingly uninterested, deciding instead to promote the "Makin' Copies" character, played by Rob Schneider. The skit ends with Carvey and Roseanne in a climactic fight scene, but Roseanne comically keeps getting back up. She and then Carvey are shot by the still-alive Jon Lovitz, who claims the Church Lady character for himself.

The Church Lady appeared on ABC's The Dana Carvey Show as part of a larger sketch where a viewer letter asked whether Dana Carvey's SNL characters were to appear on the show. The sketch responded by claiming that ABC used Disney's high-profile lawyers to engage NBC in a hostile takeover, gaining the rights to Carvey's SNL characters, as well as some of the IPs of David Letterman's show on CBS. It then cuts to the Church Lady reading David Letterman's Top Ten List.

Carvey reprised the character and sketch when he hosted the show in its 36th season, the Church Lady interviewing "the Kardashian sisters", attempting to exorcise "Snooki", and notably becoming enraptured and aroused by Justin Bieber before being settled down by God.

In 2016, the Church Lady was the opening skit on May 7 (season 41, episode 19) with Ted Cruz (Taran Killam) and Donald Trump (Darrell Hammond) as her guests. Cruz, who had been recently called "Lucifer in the flesh" by John Boehner, reappeared mid-sketch as the devil after the Church Lady called Trump "an orange mannequin". She also appeared as a guest on the show's Weekend Update segment a few days before the November 2016 election, describing the election as a choice between "a bitter, female android from the ‘90s...or a riverboat gambler with a big tummy and an orange head”.

Popular catchphrases
 “Well, isn't that special?”
 "How con-VEEN-ient!"
 "Now, who could it be? Could it be ...Satan?" (during a Christmas-themed December broadcast, using a magnetic spelling board, she rearranged letters spelling "Santa" to instead spell "Satan")
 "We like ourselves, don't we?" (usually directed at a guest on her show)
 "Ah yes, from the Chippewa word meaning drop your shorts, we don't have much time." (usually directed towards a guest)

See also
List of recurring Saturday Night Live characters and sketches

References

External links
The SNL Archives

Saturday Night Live characters
Saturday Night Live sketches
Religious parodies and satires
Television characters introduced in 1986
Fictional television personalities
Female characters in television
1980s fads and trends
Saturday Night Live in the 1980s